Aliodea Morosini, called "Dea Moro" (died 1478), was the Dogaressa of Venice by marriage to the Doge Nicolò Tron (r. 1471-1473).

She was described by the chronicler Palazzo as the greatest beauty of the century, and legend claims that her beauty was of importance for the election of her spouse as doge because of the great beauty cult in Venice at the time. However, she was born to Silvestro Morosini and of an elder and more powerful family than her spouse, who was described as an upstart careerist. The coronation of her as a dogaressa was described as more magnificent than any previous in the history of Venice. She was described as a humble person. As a widow she retired to a convent and refused a state burial.

References 

 Staley, Edgcumbe:  The dogaressas of Venice : The wives of the doges, London : T. W. Laurie, 1910

15th-century Venetian people
Year of death unknown
Dogaressas of Venice
Aliodea
Year of birth unknown
1478 deaths
15th-century Venetian women